Oscar Cobb was an American architect of theaters and more. Several of his works are listed on the U.S. National Register of Historic Places.

Works
Works (with variations in attribution) include:
DuPont-Whitehouse House, built in 1875 and 1876 by Oscar Cobb & Co.; designated a Chicago Landmark in 1996.
Sioux City Municipal Auditorium, designed by architects James W. Martin and Oscar Cobb in Romanesque Revival style
Fox Theater, 1116-1128 Main St., Stevens Point, Wisconsin (Cobb,Oscar), NRHP-listed
Masonic Temple Building, 36-42 N. Fourth St., Zanesville, Ohio (Cobb,Oscar & Son), NRHP-listed
Opera House and Yates Bookshop Building, 141 and 145 N. Broadway, Lexington, Kentucky (Cobb,Oscar), NRHP-listed
Soldiers and Sailors Memorial Building and Madison Theater, 36 Park Ave., W., Mansfield, Ohio (Cobb,Oscar), NRHP-listed
Lexington Opera House
Cincinnati Shubert theater
One or more works in Mathias Mitchell Public Square-Main Street Historic District, roughly Main St. from Strongs Ave. to Second St., Stevens Point, Wisconsin (Cobb,Oscar), NRHP-listed
One or more works in Wellington Historic District, irregular pattern along Main St. from Kelley St. to W and L E RR 	Wellington, Ohio (Cobb,Oscar), NRHP-listed  Wellington Town Hall (1885, National Register)
A grand opera house in Syracuse, New York
A grand opera house in St. Paul, Minnesota
A grand opera house in Minneapolis, Minnesota
Grand Opera House (1885), St. Louis
Grand Opera House (1893), Ashland, Wisconsin

References

19th-century American architects